Epidesma is a genus of moths in the subfamily Arctiinae. The genus was erected by Jacob Hübner in 1819.

Species
 Epidesma albicincta (Hampson, 1905)
 Epidesma aurimacula (Schaus, 1905)
 Epidesma crameri (Travassos, 1938)
 Epidesma hoffmannsi (Rothschild, 1912)
 Epidesma imitata (Druce, 1883)
 Epidesma josioides (Zerny, 1931)
 Epidesma klagesi (Rothschild, 1912)
 Epidesma metapolia (Dognin, 1912)
 Epidesma obliqua (Schaus, 1898)
 Epidesma oceola (Dyar, 1910)
 Epidesma parva (Rothschild, 1912)
 Epidesma perplexa (Rothschild, 1912)
 Epidesma similis (Rothschild, 1912)
 Epidesma trita (Dognin, 1911)
 Epidesma ursula (Stoll, [1781])

References

 
Euchromiina
Moth genera